Helen Pickett is an American choreographer for stage and film, and has been described as “one of the few prominent women in ballet today”.

Early life and education
Pickett was raised in San Francisco, California. Her mother is a retired periodontist and agricultural biologist, and her father is an author. She started ballet at eight years old, receiving dance training at California Ballet, the Ballet Society of San Diego, and San Francisco Ballet School. Pickett attended Lowell High School in San Francisco and earned her Masters of Fine Arts in Dance from Hollins University in 2011.

Performing career

In 1987, Pickett joined William Forsythe’s Frankfurt Ballet, where she performed until 1998. She was an original cast member in many of Forsythe’s seminal works throughout her career, including her speaking role, Agnes, in Impressing the Czar in 2005. Pickett’s interest in acting took her to New York in 1998, where she joined The Wooster Group.

She studied acting for two years with Penny Templeton. From 2003-2007, she collaborated as an actress and choreographer with video artists such as Eve Sussman, Toni Dove, and Laurie Simmons. She was also a member of the Deep Ellum Ensemble in Dallas, Texas, from 2003 to 2005 under the direction of Matthew Earnest. Pickett was named in the list "25 to Watch" by Dance Magazine in 2007.

In 2005, Pickett stepped back into the speaking role of Agnes in Impressing the Czar by Forsythe. She also performed with the Royal Ballet of Flanders from 2005 until 2011, and with the Saxon State Opera in Dresden, Germany, from 2013 until 2017.

Choreography
Pickett's choreographic debut was in 2005 with the Boston Ballet. She has choreographed over forty ballets internationally, including two full-length ballets: Camino Real for the Atlanta Ballet and The Crucible for the Scottish Ballet.

Pickett was resident choreographer for the Atlanta Ballet from 2012 to 2017.

The following are some of the repertoires where Pickett's choreography is included:
 Alberta Ballet
 American Ballet Theatre
 Aspen Santa Fe Ballet
 Atlanta Ballet
 Ballet West
 Ballet X
 Boston Ballet
 Charlotte Ballet
 Cincinnati Ballet
 Dance Theatre of Harlem
 Kansas City Ballet
 Oregon Ballet Theatre
 Philadelphia Ballet
 Pittsburgh Ballet Theatre
 Royal Ballet of Flanders 
 Saxon State Opera
 Scottish Ballet
 Smuin Ballet
 Vienna State Ballet

In addition, she choreographed Les Troyens for the Chicago Lyric Opera, and an evening-length, musical with multimedia, Voices of the Amazon.

In 2020, Pickett's choreography pivoted to a series of five films created and rehearsed entirely in private living spaces on Zoom. She also choreographed a 2nd series of films called The Shakespeare Cycle, creating a total of 11 films.

Teaching, motivational speaking and talk shows
Pickett has taught Forsythe improvisation techniques for schools and universities throughout the United States. She is also a motivational speaker who focuses on the topics of re-imagining creativity, supporting and building community, and inclusion. In May 2020, she started a talk show known as Creative Vitality Jam Sessions, in which she has interviewed over fifty-five dance artists.

In 2021, she became co-director for the Jacob's Pillow Contemporary Program.

References

External links
 Helen Pickett's official website

Ballet choreographers
American choreographers
Living people
Year of birth missing (living people)
People from San Diego
Hollins University alumni
Motivational speakers
American women choreographers
People from San Francisco
Ballet dancers
21st-century American women